Edna & Harvey: Harvey's New Eyes, also known as Harvey's New Eyes, is a point-and-click adventure game created by Daedalic Entertainment. The game was released in Germany on August 26, 2011. Harvey's New Eyes is a sequel to Edna & Harvey: The Breakout.

Gameplay
The game is set in a 2D cartoon world. The player controls Lilli. Unlike most other adventure games, there are no clickable dialogues. After the player clicks on a character, a bar appears with some symbols indicating a subject. The game neither has a list with actions such as Walk, Look, Talk, Pick up, Use. If applicable, items are automatically added to the inventory when the user clicks on them. Furthermore, the user must combine objects in their inventory in order to create new ones (or to modify existing items). Objects in the inventory can be given to other characters or can be combined with items not in the inventory.

Plot
The game starts in a strict boarding school led by a female convent order. The head of the convent order is abbess Ignatz. One of the pupils is Lilli, the main character. She is a shy, insecure little girl not daring to speak in public. She does not have her own opinions (or is afraid to say them) and she executes all charged tasks. Another pupil is Edna and it is obvious she is not as crazy as in The Breakout.

The abbess can't stand the youthful behavior anymore. That's why she wants to bring in doctor Marcel. He must brainwash the children so they will be all good and modest. When Edna hears this news she wants to escape: she pushed doctor Marcel down the stairs at the end of The Breakout and left him for dead although she can't remember the reason. She is now afraid doctor Marcel wants revenge if he finds her. That's why Edna gives Lilli the task to remove all evidence of Edna's presence.

Lilli discovers that Gerret, one of the elder students, is an undercover agent. He wants to expose the malpractice of Ignatz. He also warns Lilli she might get caught by Marcel, which eventually happens. Marcel uses the ragdoll Harvey to hypnotize Lilli. The hypnosis prevents Lilli taking the following actions: playing with fire, to disobey adults, to lie, to drink alcohol, to use sharp objects, to enter dangerous places and to get angry. Each time Lilli makes a violation, the hypnosis gives her an electric shock. At such time, a demon-version of Harvey turns up and tells Lilli what she has done wrong.

Gerret gives Lilli a truth serum, which has to be drunk by Ignatz. By doing this, Gerret discovers that the misbehavior is caused by a child-hood trauma. Gerret also tells Lilli she can beat the hypnosis by fighting the prohibition-demons. This action causes her to go into trance. In these trance-worlds she is able to find solutions to get rid of the prohibitions one by one.

In meantime, Edna escaped the boarding school and Lilli and Gerret try to find her. Edna gets kidnapped by some men who work for Marcel. They take her to the asylum. Gerret seeks for help while Lilli penetrates into the asylum. Lilli eventually finds Edna in her former cell, where both Gerret and the brainwashed Ignatz are also held captive. Lilli is able to get Ignatz out of her trance. Ignatz regrets her actions and gives Lilli a knife to rescue Edna and Gerret. Marcel tries to convince Lilli she is very ill and needs therapy. Edna remembers what happened in The Breakout. As Lilli has overcome all her restrictions, she can do whatever she wants. This causes the game to have three different endings: she stabs Marcel, she confirms she is ill and goes into therapy, or she objects and leaves, finally fed up with people telling her what to do without asking her what she wants.

Reception

Domestic
{{Video game reviews
| rev1 = 4Players
| rev1Score = 90/100<ref name=4playersrev>{{cite web | archiveurl=https://web.archive.org/web/20111107220516/http://www.4players.de/4players.php/dispbericht/PC-CDROM/Test/25738/72677/0/Harveys_Neue_Augen.html | url=http://www.4players.de/4players.php/dispbericht/PC-CDROM/Test/25738/72677/0/Harveys_Neue_Augen.html | title=Test: Harveys Neue Augen | date=August 26, 2011 | author=Wöbbeking, Jan | work=4Players | language=German | archivedate=November 7, 2011 | url-status=dead }}</ref>
| rev2 = Gameswelt| rev2Score = 89%
| rev3 = GameStar| rev3Score = 86/100
| rev4 = PC Games| rev4Score = 85%
}}

According to Carsten Fichtelmann of Daedalic Entertainment, Harvey's New Eyes'' sold 80,000 physical copies at German retailers.

International
The game was awarded a score of 75/100 on Metacritic, which is better than its predecessor, which only received 57/100. On AdventureGamers.com the game got a 3.5 out of 5 with the remark it is a good game with an easy interface, although not as fun as The Breakout. IGN gave the game a rating of 6/10 asserting that most of the characters are underdeveloped and that the environments are banal and uninteresting.

References

2011 video games
Adventure games
Linux games
MacOS games
Windows games
Daedalic Entertainment games
Point-and-click adventure games
Video games featuring female protagonists
Video games about rabbits and hares
Video games developed in Germany